Sophie Tilson is an Australian actress, writer and producer. She was one of the stars of the 2009 web series OzGirl. She is perhaps best known for playing the character Lisa Devine on the Australian soap opera Neighbours. Her first screenplay, Wrong Swipe, which she wrote with her partner, Shanrah Wakefield, was scheduled to be released February 10, 2016 on Lifetime.

Early life
Tilson grew up in Melbourne where she attended University High school. She studied at the Victorian College of the Arts and the Swinburne University of Technology where she received a degree in Media, Communication, and Literature.

Career
In 2009, Tilson starred in the Australia-based web series, OzGirl. The series won several awards including best actor at the 4th Annual ITVfest, which Tilson shared with her co-star Shanrah Wakefield as well as the Streamy Award for best foreign web series.

In 2010, she played the role of Lisa Devine on the Australian soap opera Neighbours.

In 2014, she appeared in the Ion Television original holiday movie, Merry Ex-Mas opposite Kristy Swanson.

In 2015, her screenplay for the movie, Swipe, which she wrote with her former OzGirl co-star, Shanrah Wakefield, was produced for Lifetime TV and is scheduled to air later this year. The film has recently been re titled Wrong Swipe and is scheduled to air February 10, 2016.

Filmography

Awards and recognitions
ITVfest 
2009 Best actor for OzGirl
2009 Best web series for OzGirl
Streamy Awards Best foreign web series for OzGirl
Additional Recognitions
2009 WebSeriesToday Breakout star award

External links

References

Australian television actresses
Australian film actresses
Australian screenwriters
Australian web series actresses
Australian expatriate actresses in the United States
Living people
Year of birth missing (living people)